Water ice could refer to:
Ice formed by water (as opposed to other substances)
The alternate term for various similar frozen fruit-flavoured desserts:
Italian ice primarily in Philadelphia and the Delaware Valley
Sorbet
Ice made from flowing water (as opposed to ice from precipitation) in ice climbing